Kaveh Lotfollah Afrasiabi (born 1958) is an Iranian-American political scientist and author. In January 2021, Afrasiabi was arrested by the FBI on charges of working as an unregistered agent of the Iranian government.

Career
Afrasiabi is a prominent Iranian-American political scientist and author of several books—on Iran, Islam, ecology, Middle East, UN reform, as well as poetry and fiction—and numerous articles in international newspapers and journals. Afrasiabi gained a PhD in Political Science from Boston University in 1998, with a thesis titled "State and Populism in Iran" under the supervision of famed historian Howard Zinn. Afrasiabi has also studied theology at Andover-Newton Theological School and his theological writings have been praised by Bishop John Chane as a "must read" in his introduction to Afrasiabi's book, titled Mahdism, Shiism, and Communicative Eco-Theology (2015). Afrasiabi's seminal article on "Communicative theory and theology" initially published in Harvard Theological Review has been reprinted by Cambridge University Press. Afrasiabi has denied the US allegations against him and published a book in response, titled Agent of Peace: Response to US Complaint (March 2021). Denouncing the charges as politically-motivated by the outgoing Trump administration in order to complicate its successor administration's Iran policy, Afrasiabi has urged the readers in this book to read his compendium of articles and to ascertain for themselves that the US allegation of propaganda is baseless and that his international affairs consulting role for Iran was completely legitimate and transparent under the UN regulations.

Afrasiabi has taught political science at the University of Tehran, Boston University, and Bentley University. Afrasiabi has been a visiting scholar at Harvard University (1989-1990), University of California, Berkeley (2000-2001), Binghamton University (2001-2002) and the Center for Strategic Research, Tehran. During 2004-2005, Afrasiabi was involved as an advisor to Iran's nuclear negotiation team.

Afrasiabi is a former consultant to the United Nations "Dialogue Among Civilizations", for which he interviewed the former Iranian president, Mohammad Khatami. Afrasiabi is a member of the advisory board of the Campaign Against Sanctions and Military Intervention in Iran. Afrasiabi has authored numerous articles in scholarly journals and newspapers, including the New York Times, Washington Post, CNN, UN Chronicle, San Francisco Chronicle, Washington Times, Council on Foreign Relations, London's Guardian, Berlin's Der Tagesspiegel, Der TAZ, Harvard Theological Review, Harvard International Review, Brown's Journal of World Affairs, Columbia Journal of International Affairs, Global Dialogue, Mediterranean Affairs, Middle East Journal, Middle East Eye, Asia Times, Modern Diplomacy, and Boston Globe.

Selected works
 After Khomeini: New Directions in Iran's Foreign Policy (Westview Books, 1994)
 Nir/North: A Cinematic Story about the Iran-Contra Affair (1996)
 Infringements: Poems (1998)
 Islam and Ecology (Harvard University Press, 2003)
 Iran's Nuclear Program: Debating Facts Versus Fiction (2006)
 Reading in Iran's Foreign Policy After September 11 (2008)
 Looking For Rights At Harvard (2010)
 UN Management Reform (2011)
 Iran Phobia and US Terror Plot: A Legal Deconstruction (2012)
 Shiism, Mahdism, and Communicative Eco-Theology (2015)
 Upstairs, Downstairs at Andala and Other Short Stories (2015)
 Iran Nuclear Negotiations: Accord and Détente Since the Geneva Agreement of 2013 (Rowman & Littlefield, 2015)
 Metaphors in September: Poems Dedicated to the Victims of 9/11(2016)
 Upstairs, Downstairs at Andala: Short Stories (2016).
 Touched by Messiah at Vicki's: Story on Love, Faith, and Healing: A Novella (2016).
 Shiraz Diaries & Jallad: A Novel on Contemporary Iran (2016)
 Iran Nuclear Accord and the Remaking of the Middle East (Rowman & littlefield, 2017)
 Trump and Iran: From Containment to Confrontation (Lexington Books, 2019)
 The Pandemic Mirror: Poems (2020)
 Aphorisms on Love, Life, Freedom, Healing, Faith (2021)
 Agent of Peace: Response to US Complaint (2021)
 Seasons of Love: Poems (2021)
 Peace on Earth: Poems (2022)
 Three Plays (2022)
 Warhol the Sketch Artist: A Play (2022)
 Ode to Ukraine: Poetry (2022)
 Anti-Mearsheimer: Putin's Unjust War and the IR Theory (2022)
 Romeo and Juliet in Kherson: A Play (2022)
 John Quincy Adams and the Origins of Critical Legal Thought in America: A Heideggerian Re-Interpretation (2022)

Controversy

Afrasiabi v. Mottahedeh
From 1996 to 2003, Afrasiabi was involved in a legal conflict with Roy Mottahedeh, former director of the Center for Middle Eastern Studies at Harvard University, who had been his superior during Afrasiabi's time as a postdoctoral fellow at Harvard, and Harvard University itself. The conflict started with an alleged extortion against Mottahedeh's subordinates and a "pre-dawn" arrest of Afrasiabi by Harvard police, and terminated in 2003 with a civil rights case against Harvard, Mottahedeh and the Supreme Court of the United States, in which Afrasiabi acted as his own attorney. During associated controversies, Afrasiabi was supported by Mike Wallace of the US television program 60 Minutes, author David Mamet, linguist Noam Chomsky and political scientist Howard Zinn, and former deputy prime minister of Iran, Farhang Mehr. In a video deposition, Wallace has defended Afrasiabi and accused professor Mottahedeh of making false statements to him about Afrasiabi. His "David and Goliath" battle with Harvard has been praised by Mike Wallace, who has stated "I admire Dr. Afrasiabi. He has been wronged. The cannons of Harvard are lined up against a pea shooter."

Political Scientist Author Charged With Acting As An Unregistered Agent Of The Iranian Government 
Afrasiabi was arrested on January 18, 2021 for acting as an unregistered agent of Iran.

References

Iranian political scientists
Iranian emigrants to the United States
Academic staff of the University of Tehran
University of California, Berkeley faculty
Boston University faculty
Harvard University staff
1958 births
Living people